Thiago Agustín Tirante (born 10 April 2001) is an Argentine tennis player. He has a career high ATP singles ranking of World No. 197 achieved on 21 March 2022 and a career high doubles ranking of No. 257 achieved on 1 November 2021.

He also achieved a career-high ITF juniors year-end ranking of number 1 in the world in 2019.

Tirante won the 2019 French Open – Boys' doubles title.

Junior Grand Slam titles

Doubles: 1 (1 title)

ITF World Tennis Tour and ATP Challenger finals

Singles 7 (2–5)

Doubles 9 (3–6)

References

External links

2001 births
Living people
Argentine male tennis players
Sportspeople from La Plata
French Open junior champions
Grand Slam (tennis) champions in boys' doubles
21st-century Argentine people